Baci di dama are a type of Northern Italian sandwich cookie. "Baci di dama" means "Lady's kisses" in English. Baci di dama are a sandwich cookie, consisting of two hazelnut cookies joined together by chocolate, representing the "kiss" in the name. Considered a standard of Italian confectionery, these are a common item at Italian bakeries throughout Italy and in Italian diaspora communities. Though traditionally made with hazelnut cookies, there are currently many modern flavour variations. The most common variations are made with almonds, pistachios, and cocoa in place of hazelnuts.

History
Baci di dama originate from the town of Tortona in the Northern Italian region of Piedmont . They were created in the 19th Century as a way to utilize hazelnuts that are local to the Piedmont region. Baci di dama have been classified as a traditional, protected Piedmontese product (P.A.T. - Prodotti agroalimentari tradizionali piemontesi).

See also
List of cookies
Italian cuisine

References

External links

Cookies
Italian pastries
Cuisine of Piedmont